The men's road race at the 1969 UCI Road World Championships was the 36th edition of the event. The race took place on Sunday 10 August 1969 in Zolder, Belgium. The race was won by Harm Ottenbros of the Netherlands.

Final classification

References

Men's Road Race
UCI Road World Championships – Men's road race
UCI Road World Championships Men's Road Race
UCI Road World Championships Men's Road Race